Coleophora cornella is a moth of the family Coleophoridae. It is found in the United States, including New York and California.

The larvae feed on the leaves of Cornus pubescens species. They create a spatulate leaf case.

References

cornella
Moths described in 1882
Moths of North America